Evolution: The Story of Life is a non-fiction book by Douglas Palmer.

External links
 Evolution: The Story of Life at Amazon

Paleontology books
2009 non-fiction books
University of California Press books